The  Detroit Lions season was the franchise's 82nd season in the National Football League, their 78th as the Detroit Lions, the 10th playing its home games at Ford Field and the third year under head coach Jim Schwartz.  With a regular season record of 10–6, the team improved on its 6–10 record from 2010, making it their third consecutive improved season. It was the Lions' first winning season since 2000 and first 10 win season since 1995. The Lions' 5–0 start was their best since 1956. With their win over the San Diego Chargers on December 24, the Lions clinched an NFC Wild Card spot in the postseason. After their loss to the Green Bay Packers in Week 17, it was determined the Lions would play the New Orleans Saints in one of the NFC Wild Card Games, which the Lions lost 45–28. It was their first playoff berth since 1999.

The Lions ran a pass-heavy offense in 2011, mainly due to early injuries of running backs Mikel Leshoure, who was injured in the preseason and Jahvid Best, who was injured with a concussion in week 6 against the 49ers. Kevin Smith was signed in November as running back, but he too was injured, this time a high ankle sprain during week 11 that inhibited his running. Quarterback Matthew Stafford's 663 passing attempts (41.4 attempts per game) led the league, and they only ran the ball on 33.8% of their plays, a league low. According to statistics site Football Outsiders, the Lions went into shotgun formation a league-leading 68% of offensive plays in 2011. Stafford became only the fourth quarterback to pass for 5,000 yards in a season, and his 5,038 yards passing are 5th-most in NFL history (though only 3rd in the 2011 NFL season).

The 474 points that the Lions scored in 2011 are the most in franchise history, and only the second time that the team had scored 400+ points in a season.

Offseason

Draft

Offseason signings

Regular season transactions
On October 18, the Lions attempted to trade running back Jerome Harrison and an undisclosed pick in the 2013 NFL Draft to the Philadelphia Eagles for running back Ronnie Brown, but the deal was voided due after Harrison failed his Eagles physical with what Adam Schefter of ESPN reported was a then-undiagnosed brain tumor. Harrison had surgery on October 21 and was placed on the injured reserve list for the remainder of the season.
The same day, the Lions signed free agent running back Eldra Buckley to replace Harrison in the lineup.

Final roster

Schedule

Preseason

Regular season

Note: Intra-division opponents are in bold text.

Postseason

Regular season results

Standings

Week 1: at Tampa Bay Buccaneers

To start the season, the Lions traveled south to Tampa, Florida to take on the Tampa Bay Buccaneers. The Lions scored first in the first quarter with a 23-yard field goal by Jason Hanson. The Buccaneers tied it up with a 38-yard field goal by Connor Barth, then took the lead when Aqib Talib intercepted a pass from Matthew Stafford and ran it in 28 yards. The Lions responded with a 28-yard field goal. In the second quarter, Detroit took the lead with a 36-yard touchdown catch by Calvin Johnson, and later added more points when Tony Scheffler caught an 11-yard TD pass. Tampa Bay responded with a 31-yard field goal just before halftime. The second half was relatively quiet, with each team only scoring one touchdown. First, Detroit's Calvin Johnson caught a 1-yard pass in the third quarter. The game's final points came when Mike Williams of Tampa Bay caught a 5-yard pass.  The Lions won their regular season opener for the first time since 2007

Week 2: vs. Kansas City Chiefs

For their home opener, the Lions hosted the Kansas City Chiefs. The Lions scored first when Calvin Johnson caught a 15-yard pass for a touchdown. Kansas City then scored their only points of the game with a 33-yard field goal by Ryan Succop. In the second quarter, the Lions' Tony Scheffler caught a 36-yard pass for a touchdown. They added to their lead with two field goals from Jason Hanson, from 51 and 28 yards respectively. After halftime, the Lions scored four consecutive touchdowns, three of which followed Kansas City turnovers. First, Calvin Johnson scored on a 1-yard catch. Afterward, Jahvid Best scored two consecutive touchdowns in the fourth quarter, first with a 9-yard catch, and later on a 1-yard run. The Lions capped their blowout victory with a 1-yard run by Keiland Williams.  The blowout win set the franchise record for largest margin of victory. It was the first time the Lions went 2–0 since 2007. Lions QB Matthew Stafford – who completed 23 of 39 passes, threw for 294 yards and 4 touchdowns – won the FedEx Air NFL Player of the Week for his performance.

Week 3: at Minnesota Vikings

In week 3, the Lions traveled west to Minneapolis, Minnesota to face their NFC North Division rivals the Minnesota Vikings. The first half was all Minnesota. In the first quarter, the Vikings' Ryan Longwell made two consecutive field goals, from 33 and 41 yards out respectively. The second quarter featured two consecutive Minnesota touchdowns: first on a 6-yard run by Adrian Peterson, and next on an 8-yard catch by Visanthe Shiancoe. After halftime, the Lions mounted a comeback. In the third quarter, Detroit's Calvin Johnson caught a 32-yard pass for a touchdown. They added more points with a 28-yard field goal by Jason Hanson. In the fourth quarter, Calvin Johnson caught another touchdown pass, this one from 5 yards out. Detroit then tied it up with a 50-yard field goal, and took their first lead of the game, 23–20, after a 40-yard Jason Hanson 3-pointer. Minnesota tied it up again with a 49-yard field goal late in the game, taking it to overtime. Detroit won the coin toss and got the ball first, then scored a 32-yard field goal to win the game. Detroit's 20-point comeback was biggest on the road in team history. It was also the first time the Lions beat the Vikings at the Metrodome since 1997, and the first time the Lions started 3–0 since 1980.

Week 4: at Dallas Cowboys

In week 4, the Lions traveled south to Arlington, Texas to take on the Dallas Cowboys. The Cowboys dominated the first half, putting the Lions in a big hole for the second straight week. First came a 25-yard touchdown catch by Dez Bryant. In the second quarter, Bryant scored again on a 6-yard touchdown catch. Dallas added more points with a 41-yard field goal by Dan Bailey. The Lions then got their only points of the first half with a 33-yard field goal by Jason Hanson. The Cowboys responded with a 35-yard field goal just before halftime. After the break, Dallas added more points with a 1-yard touchdown pass to Jason Witten, putting them up 27–3. The Lions responded with two consecutive defensive touchdowns: first a 34-yard interception return by Bobby Carpenter, then a 56-yard pick-6 by Chris Houston. The Cowboys scored their final points of the game with a 23-yard field goal late in the third quarter. In the fourth quarter, the Lions continued their comeback with a 23-yard touchdown catch by Calvin Johnson. They made it a three-point game with a 51-yard field goal by Jason Hanson, then Romo threw an interception to Stephen Tulloch, and took their first lead of the game late in the final quarter when Calvin Johnson caught his second touchdown of the game from 2 yards out to become only the second player in NFL history to record at least two touchdown catches in 4 straight games (the other to do so is former Vikings receiver Cris Carter). The Lions defense held off Dallas for the win. Like the previous week, the Lions came back and won it in the final moments of the game after being down by a large margin at halftime. It was the first time the Lions started 4–0 since 1980. This also was its franchise-record fifth straight road win. Ironically, their last game at Dallas saw the Lions lose their franchise-record 26th straight road game.

Week 5: vs. Chicago Bears

In week 5, the Lions hosted a nationally televised primetime NFC North Division duel against the Chicago Bears. It was the first ever Monday Night Football game at Ford Field, the first MNF appearance for the Lions since 2001, and the first Monday night game in the city of Detroit since 1974. Neither team scored in the first quarter. In the second quarter, the Lions got an early lead with a 73-yard catch and run by Calvin Johnson. With this, Johnson became the first receiver in NFL history to record 9 touchdown catches in a season's first five games. The Bears got on the board with a 44-yard field goal by Robbie Gould, and took the lead with a 9-yard catch by Kellen Davis. After halftime, the Lions regained the lead and never gave it back. First came an 18-yard TD catch by Brandon Pettigrew. A few minutes later, Detroit's Jahvid Best ran in a TD from 88 yards out, the second longest touchdown run in franchise history. Each team scored a field goal in the fourth quarter: first one by Chicago from 49 yards out, then a 31-yarder by Jason Hanson that completed the scoring. With the win, the Lions also started 5–0 for the first time since 1956 and also snapped their 6-game losing streak against the Bears. Ford Field's record crowd of nearly 68,000 fans caused 9 false start penalties by the Bears.

Week 6: vs. San Francisco 49ers

In week 6, the Lions hosted the NFC West Division-leading San Francisco 49ers. The Lions struck first, when Jason Hanson kicked a 25-yard field goal that came after a San Francisco turnover. Detroit added to their lead when Brandon Pettigrew caught a 16-yard TD pass. In the second quarter, the 49ers finally got on the board with a 1-yard TD run by Frank Gore. San Francisco received a safety when Aldon Smith sacked Matthew Stafford in the end zone. The final points of the first half came just before intermission when David Akers of the 49ers kicked a 55-yard field goal, putting the Lions down at halftime for the fourth consecutive week. After the break, Detroit scored on a 24-yard field goal. San Francisco responded with a field goal of their own, this one from 31 yards out. In the fourth quarter, the Lions' Nate Burleson caught a 5-yard TD pass; the Lions went for a 2-point conversion but Calvin Johnson failed to catch Matthew Stafford's pass. In the final 2 minutes, the 49ers rallied from behind, first with a 6-yard TD catch by Delanie Walker, then a 37-yard field goal by David Akers, putting them up 25–19. With 1:02 left in the game, the Lions attempted another comeback, but San Francisco's defense held them off, handing Detroit its first loss of the season as the team fell to 5–1 and 2nd place in the NFC North. After the game, coaches Jim Schwartz and Jim Harbaugh got into an argument after Schwartz claimed Harbaugh pushed him out of the way when the two coaches were shaking hands.

Week 7: vs. Atlanta Falcons

In week 7, the Lions hosted the Atlanta Falcons. The Lions took an early lead with a 43-yard field goal by Jason Hanson that came after a Falcons turnover. The Falcons tied it up with a field goal of their own, this one a 23-yarder by Matt Bryant. Atlanta took the lead with a 1-yard quarterback sneak by Matt Ryan. In the second quarter, Jason Hanson kicked another field goal, this time from 38 yards out. Atlanta scored the final points of the first half when Roddy White caught an 18-yard touchdown pass. After halftime, Jason Hanson kicked his third field goal, this one from 29 yards. Atlanta responded with a 47-yard field goal. Late in the third quarter, Detroit scored their only touchdown of the game, with a 57-yard catch and run by Calvin Johnson. The only points of the fourth quarter came a 40-yard Falcons field goal.

Week 8: at Denver Broncos

In week 8, the Lions traveled west to Denver, Colorado for an interconference duel with the Denver Broncos. The Broncos scored their only points of the first half on their opening drive, getting a 39-yard field goal from Matt Prater. With a 41-yard touchdown catch by Titus Young, the Lions took the lead and never gave it back. In the second quarter, Jason Hanson kicked a 50-yard field goal. Next, Tony Scheffler caught a 1-yard touchdown pass. Just before halftime, Maurice Morris ran in a touchdown from 1-yard out, putting the Lions up 24–3. After the intermission, the Lions continued their domination with three more unanswered touchdowns. First, Cliff Avril picked up a Tim Tebow fumble and returned it 24 yards for 6 points. Calvin Johnson then scored a touchdown on a 56-yard catch and run. Chris Houston then intercepted a Tim Tebow pass in the end zone and ran the entire length of the field for a score to cap the Lions victory. The Broncos then scored their only points of the second half on a 14-yard touchdown catch by Eric Decker. The Lions defense sacked Tim Tebow seven times. Lions defensive end Cliff Avril, who recorded two sack fumbles and touchdown, was named the NFC Defensive Player of the Week for his performance. The Lions' 45 points was the most scored on the road since 1967. With the win, the Lions went into their bye week with a 6–2 record. Detroit also extended its road winning streak (dating back to 2010) to six straight games.

Week 10: at Chicago Bears

After their bye week, the Lions traveled to Chicago, Illinois for a rematch with their division foes the Chicago Bears. Chicago started the scoring with a 6-yard touchdown rush by Matt Forte. The Bears added to their lead with a 43-yard field goal by Robbie Gould. In the second quarter, Chicago added more points with a 35-yard field goal, and made it a 20–0 game when Devin Hester returned a punt 82 yards for a touchdown. Detroit finally got on the board with two consecutive field goals by Jason Hanson, from 29 and 35 yards out respectively. After halftime, the Bears defense intercepted Lions QB Matthew Stafford twice for touchdowns. First, Major Wright caught one and ran it in 24 yards. Then Charles Tillman completed a 44-yard pick 6. The Bears added to their large lead with a 50-yard field goal. The Lions scored their only points of the second half with a 10-yard touchdown catch by Tony Scheffler. This was the Lions' first road loss of the season. The game was marred by an on-field fight between players midway through the 4th quarter.

Week 11: vs. Carolina Panthers

In week 11, the Lions hosted the Carolina Panthers. The Panthers took an early lead in the first quarter when Olindo Mare kicked a 27-yard field goal, and made it 10–0 when Steve Smith caught a 15-yard touchdown pass. The Lions answered in the second quarter when Kevin Smith ran in a touchdown from 28 yards out. Carolina responded with 2 touchdowns. First, Kealoha Pilares returned a kickoff the entire length of the field for 7 points, then a few minutes later, QB Cam Newton ran it in himself for another 7. At this point, the Lions were down by 17 points with the score 24–7. The Lions' Titus Young then caught a 3-yard pass for a TD. The Panthers kicked a 31-yard field goal just before halftime, putting the Lions down by 13 points. After the break, the Lions mounted yet another second half comeback with 3 consecutive touchdowns. First, Nate Burleson caught a 6-yard pass, then Tony Scheffler caught a 17-yard pass, giving the Lions their first lead of the game. Then in the 4th quarter, Kevin Smith scored his second touchdown of the game, this one on a 4-yard rush. The Panthers scored their only points of the second half when Cam Newton recorded his second rushing touchdown; Carolina's Cam Newton then completed a 2-point conversion to Steve Smith to tie the game. A few minutes later, Detroit retook the lead when Brandon Pettigrew caught a 7-yard pass for a TD. The Lions capped their victory with Kevin Smith's third touchdown of the game, this one on a 19-yard rush.
By winning this game after trailing by 17 points, the Lions are the first team in NFL history that have won 3 games in one season in which they trailed by at least 17 points.

Week 12: vs. Green Bay Packers (Thanksgiving Day game)

For their annual Thanksgiving Day game, the Lions hosted their NFC North Division rivals, the then-undefeated Green Bay Packers. After a scoreless first quarter, Detroit trailed in the second quarter after Packers quarterback Aaron Rodgers completed a 3-yard touchdown pass to wide receiver Greg Jennings. After halftime, Green Bay added to their lead in the third quarter when fullback John Kuhn scored with a 1-yard touchdown run, followed by a 65-yard touchdown catch to wide receiver James Jones. Later, Mason Crosby scored with a 35-yard field goal. Detroit finally get on the board in the fourth quarter with a 16-yard touchdown run from running back Keiland Williams (with a successful two-point conversion pass from quarterback Matthew Stafford to wide receiver Titus Young), but the Packers pulled away when Crosby booted a 32-yard field goal. The Lions closed out the game when Stafford hooked up with wide receiver Calvin Johnson on a 3-yard touchdown pass late in the final quarter.

Week 13: at New Orleans Saints

In week 13, the Lions traveled south for a nationally televised prime-time contest with the New Orleans Saints. The Saints scored the only points of the first quarter when John Kasay kicked a 39-yard field goal. New Orleans added to their lead in the second quarter with 2 consecutive touchdowns: first with a 14-yard run by Mark Ingram II, then a 67-yard catch and run by Robert Meachem. Detroit scored their only points of the first half when Kevin Smith ran in a touchdown from 2 yards out. The Saints responded when Drew Brees threw a 20-yard touchdown pass to Lance Moore. After halftime, the Lions attempted a comeback when Jason Hanson kicked a 31-yard field goal, and later Maurice Morris caught a 9-yard touchdown pass from Matthew Stafford. However, the Saints pulled away in the final quarter when Darren Sproles caught a 6-yard pass for a touchdown.

Week 14: vs. Minnesota Vikings

In week 14, the Lions hosted a rematch with their NFC North rivals the Minnesota Vikings. The Lions took an early lead which they never gave back after Vikings quarterback Christian Ponder fumbled the ball on the Vikings' first offensive play of the game and Stephen Tulloch picked it up in the end zone for a touchdown. The Lions added more points when Titus Young caught a Matthew Stafford pass and ran it in 57 yards for a TD, and added another seven when Brandon Pettigrew caught a 12-yard pass. The Vikings got on the board late in the first quarter when Visanthe Shiancoe caught a seven-yard pass from Ponder. In the second quarter, Detroit's defense scored again when Alphonso Smith intercepted a Ponder pass and ran it back 30 yards for a TD. Minnesota responded when Percy Harvin caught a six-yard touchdown pass. The Lions scored the final points of the first half when Jason Hanson kicked a 30-yard field goal. This was their first 31-point first half since 1985. After halftime, Vikings backup quarterback Joe Webb came into the game and ran in a touchdown himself from 65 yards out. In the fourth quarter, the Lions scored their only points of the second half when Hanson kicked his second field goal of the game, this one from 26 yards out. Minnesota responded with a two-yard TD catch by Toby Gerhart. After a defensive stop, the Vikings attempted a late comeback when they drove down the field in the final minute of the game, but Webb fumbled the ball after being sacked by DeAndre Levy on first and goal with nine seconds left, evading a facemask call, but handing the Lions the victory.

Week 15: at Oakland Raiders

In week 15, the Lions traveled west for an interconference duel with the Oakland Raiders. The Raiders struck first when Louis Murphy ran in a touchdown from 12 yards out. The Lions responded with a 51-yard touchdown pass from Matthew Stafford to Calvin Johnson. In the second quarter, Oakland re-took the lead when Darrius Heyward-Bey caught a 43-yard pass from Carson Palmer, but the Lions tied it back up when Nate Burlseon caught a 39-yard pass for a TD. Oakland took the lead back just before halftime with a 46-yard field goal by Sebastian Janikowski. After a scoreless third quarter, the Raiders kicked a 51-yard field goal, and added 7 more points when Aaron Curry picked up a Matthew Stafford fumble and ran it in 6 yards for a touchdown, putting them up 27–14 with just under 8 minutes left in the game. The Lions then mounted their 6th comeback of the season from a 13+ point deficit, first with a 3-yard catch by Titus Young, then Calvin Johnson caught his second touchdown of the game from 6 yards out to put them up 28–27 with 39 seconds left to play. The Raiders then drove down the field, and attempted a 65-yard field goal on fourth down, which would have broken Sebastian Janikowski's own NFL-record of 63 yards which he shares with two other placekickers, but it was blocked by Ndamukong Suh, giving the Lions the win and keeping their playoff hopes alive as the team improved to 9–5, securing their first winning season since 2000.

Week 16: vs. San Diego Chargers

For their last home game of the regular season, the Lions hosted a rare Saturday evening contest against the San Diego Chargers. The first half was all Detroit. First came a 7-yard touchdown pass from Matthew Stafford to Brandon Pettigrew, followed by a 30-yard field goal by Jason Hanson. In the second quarter, Kevin Smith caught a 3-yard touchdown pass, followed by a Calvin Johnson 14-yard touchdown catch in the final minute of the half, putting the Lions up 24–0 at the break. After the intermission, the Chargers finally got on the board with an 11-yard touchdown pass from Philip Rivers to Malcolm Floyd, followed by a 22-yard field goal by Nick Novak. Detroit responded with a 6-yard touchdown run by Kevin Smith. The only points of the fourth quarter came when Cliff Avril intercepted a pass from Philip Rivers and ran it in 4 yards for a touchdown. With the win, the Lions improved to 10–5 and clinched an NFC Wildcard spot in the playoffs, their first postseason appearance since 1999.  Also, the Lions became the only NFC North team to beat all AFC West teams on the season.

Week 17: at Green Bay Packers

For the last game of the regular season, the Lions, hoping to clinch the #5 seed in the postseason, traveled to Green Bay, Wisconsin for a shootout with their NFC North Division rivals the Green Bay Packers. On game day it was revealed that many of the Packers' starters were inactive, giving them a chance to heal and rest up for the playoffs (the Packers having already clinched a first-round bye and first seed in their division). The Lions took an early lead when Titus Young caught an 8-yard pass from Matthew Stafford for a touchdown, and received a safety when Green Bay's Pat Lee was tackled in the end zone by team. The Packers got on the board when Mason Crosby kicked a 22-yard field goal, and got their first lead of the game when Jordy Nelson caught a 7-yard touchdown pass from backup quarterback Matt Flynn. In the second quarter, the score started to sea-saw, and continued to do so for the remainder of the game. First, the Lions' Calvin Johnson caught a 13-yard touchdown pass. Then Green Bay's Ryan Grant scored on an 80-yard catch and run. Detroit responded with a 30-yard field goal from Jason Hanson. Green Bay scored another touchdown just before halftime when Jordy Nelson caught his second touchdown pass of the game, this time from 36 yards out. After the break, the Lions' Titus Young caught another touchdown pass, this time from 2 yards out. The Packers answered with Jordy Nelson's third scoring catch, this one from 58 yards out. Detroit responded with a 5-yard touchdown catch by Kevin Smith and successfully completed a two-point conversion with a pass to Tony Scheffler. Midway through the final quarter, Green Bay's Donald Driver caught a 35-yard pass for a touchdown. Detroit re-took the lead late when Tony Scheffler caught a 12-yard pass, but the Packers gained it back when Jermichael Finley caught a 4-yard touchdown pass. The Lions then got the ball back to attempt to win the game with under a minute to play, but Stafford threw an interception with 45 seconds left, giving the Packers the victory, and the Lions' 20th consecutive loss in the state of Wisconsin. With the loss, the Lions were declared the #6 seed in the playoffs.

Postseason results
See also 2011–12 NFL Wildcard game#Detroit Lions at New Orleans Saints

NFC Wild Card Round: at #3 New Orleans Saints

Entering the postseason as the NFC's #6 seed, the Lions began their playoff run at the Mercedes-Benz Superdome for the NFC Wild Card game against the #3 seed New Orleans Saints, looking to avenge their Week 13 defeat.

Detroit struck first in the opening quarter as quarterback Matthew Stafford found tight end Will Heller with a 10-yard pass for a touchdown. The Saints answered in the second quarter when running back Darren Sproles scored a touchdown with a 2-yard run. The Lions answered back when Calvin Johnson caught a 13-yard pass for a touchdown. New Orleans closed out the half when kicker John Kasay scored a 24-yard field goal.

The Saints took the lead in the third quarter when quarterback Drew Brees completed a 41-yard touchdown pass to wide receiver Devery Henderson and later, a 3-yard touchdown pass to tight end Jimmy Graham. Detroit kept things close when Matthew Stafford scored a touchdown with a quarterback sneak from 1 yard out. New Orleans took a huge lead in the fourth quarter when Darren Sproles scored with a 17-yard touchdown run, followed by a 56-yard touchdown catch by wide receiver Robert Meachem. The Lions tried to rally as Stafford connected with Johnson again with a 12-yard touchdown pass, but the Saints pulled away for good with a 1-yard touchdown run by Pierre Thomas.

Regular season statistical leaders

 Stats are updated each week.

Awards, honors, and records

Matthew Stafford
 AP NFL Comeback Player of the Year
 PFWA Comeback Player of the Year
 NFL Alumni's Quarterback of the Year
 4th quarterback in NFL history to pass for 5,000+ yards in a season (after Dan Marino, Drew Brees twice, and Tom Brady)
 2nd quarterback in NFL history to throw for over 40 touchdowns and 5,000 yards at the age of 23. (Dan Marino)

Calvin Johnson
 2011 All-Pro Team
 2011 Pro Bowl
 2011 NFL receiving yards leader
 Madden 13 cover athlete

Staff

Notes and references

External links
 Detroit Lions official site

Detroit
Detroit Lions seasons
Detroit Lions